Ehrhardt is a town in Bamberg County, South Carolina, United States. As of the 2010 census, the town population was 545.

History
Ehrhardt was named for Conrad Ehrhardt (1832-1908), a German emigrant to South Carolina and successful saw mill operator, who was also the progenitor of a prominent local family of that name.

The Copeland House and Rivers Bridge State Park are listed on the National Register of Historic Places.

Geography
Ehrhardt is located in southern Bamberg County at  (33.095899, -81.013226). U.S. Route 601 runs through the town, leading north  to Bamberg, the county seat, and south  to Hampton. South Carolina Highway 64 crosses US 601 in Ehrhardt, leading southeast  to Walterboro and northwest  to Barnwell.

Demographics

As of the census of 2000, there were 614 people, 253 households, and 154 families residing in the town. The population density was 193.1 people per square mile (74.5/km2). There were 317 housing units at an average density of 99.7 per square mile (38.5/km2). The racial makeup of the town was 40.07% White, 56.84% African American, 1.95% from other races, and 1.14% from two or more races. Hispanic or Latino of any race were 2.77% of the population.

There were 253 households, out of which 23.3% had children under the age of 18 living with them, 42.3% were married couples living together, 15.0% had a female householder with no husband present, and 39.1% were non-families. 36.0% of all households were made up of individuals, and 17.0% had someone living alone who was 65 years of age or older. The average household size was 2.40 and the average family size was 3.15.

In the town, the population was spread out, with 24.1% under the age of 18, 5.9% from 18 to 24, 21.2% from 25 to 44, 30.1% from 45 to 64, and 18.7% who were 65 years of age or older. The median age was 44 years. For every 100 females, there were 76.9 males. For every 100 females age 18 and over, there were 76.5 males.

The median income for a household in the town was $22,813, and the median income for a family was $41,250. Males had a median income of $31,875 versus $21,250 for females. The per capita income for the town was $15,874. About 17.0% of families and 22.7% of the population were below the poverty line, including 27.6% of those under age 18 and 23.0% of those age 65 or over.

Schützenfest
The Schützenfest commemorates the town's rich German heritage and their German founder, Conrad Ehrhardt, an immigrant from Weiterode, Kurhessen, Germany. The festival is held annually.

References

External links
Town of Ehrhardt
Information on the Town of Ehrhardt from the Bamberg County Chamber of Commerce

Towns in Bamberg County, South Carolina
Towns in South Carolina